Görogly may refer to:
 Epic of Koroghlu (Görogly in the Turkmen language)
 Görogly (city), a city in Dashoguz province, Turkmenistan
 Görogly District, an administrative subdivision of Dashoguz province, Turkmenistan